The Murdoch Trial is a 1914 British silent drama film directed by Laurence Trimble and starring Florence Turner, Frank Tennant and Richard Norton. It was shot at Walton Studios.

Cast
 Florence Turner as Helen Story 
 Frank Tennant as Lionel Mann 
 Richard Norton as Henry Murdock 
 William Felton as The Butler 
 G.C. Colonna as The Nephew 
 John Kelt as The Prosecution 
 Alfred Phillips as The Defense 
 Lucy Sibley as The Housekeeper 
 Laurence Trimble as A Butler

References

Bibliography
 Low, Rachael. The History of the British Film: 1906-1914. Allen & Unwin, 1973.

External links
 

1914 films
1914 drama films
British silent feature films
British drama films
Films directed by Laurence Trimble
Films set in London
British black-and-white films
Films shot at Nettlefold Studios
Hepworth Pictures films
1910s English-language films
1910s British films
Silent drama films